Sendak is a surname. Notable people with the surname include:

 Jack Sendak (1923–1995), American children's literature author
 Maurice Sendak (1928–2012), American illustrator and children's literature author
 Philip Sendak (1894–1970), American children's literature author
 Theodore L. Sendak (1918–1999), American politician